Wan'an Subdistrict is a subdistrict in Shizhu Tujia Autonomous County, Chongqing, China. , it has 5 residential communities and 5 villages under its administration.

See also 
 List of township-level divisions of Chongqing

References 

Divisions of Shizhu Tujia Autonomous County
Subdistricts of the People's Republic of China